The 2002 MLB Japan All-Star Series was the eighth edition of the championship, a best-of-eight series between the All-Star teams from Major League Baseball (MLB) and Nippon Professional Baseball (NPB).

MLB won the series by 5–3–0 and Torii Hunter was named MVP.

Results 
Championship

Rosters

MLB All-Stars roster

NPB All-Stars roster

References

MLB Japan All-Star Series
2002 in Japanese sport
2002 in baseball